Bryolymnia mixta is a moth of the family Noctuidae first described by Donald Lafontaine and J. Walsh in 2010. It is known only from the Patagonia Mountains in south-eastern Arizona.

The length of the forewings is about 12 mm. Adults were collected in late June and mid-July.

Etymology
The specific name mixta is from the Latin mixtus, meaning mixed or mingled and refers to the blotchy confused appearance of the forewing spots.

External links

Hadeninae
Moths described in 2010